Fulk (or Foulques; c. 1089/1092 – 13 November 1143), also known as Fulk the Younger, was the count of Anjou (as Fulk V) from 1109 to 1129 and the king of Jerusalem with his wife from 1131 to his death. During their reign, the Kingdom of Jerusalem reached its largest territorial extent.

Count of Anjou
Fulk was born at Angers, between 1089 and 1092, the son of Count Fulk IV of Anjou and Bertrade de Montfort. In 1092, Bertrade deserted her husband, and bigamously married King Philip I of France.

Fulk V became count of Anjou upon his father's death in 1109. In the next year, he married Countess Erembourg (or Ermengarde) of Maine, cementing Angevin control over the County of Maine.

Fulk was originally an opponent of King Henry I of England and a supporter of King Louis VI of France, but in 1118 or 1119 he allied with Henry when he arranged for his daughter Matilda of Anjou to marry Henry's son William Adelin.  Fulk went on a pilgrimage to Jerusalem in 1119 or 1120, and became attached to the Knights Templar. He returned, late in 1121, after which he began to subsidize the Templars, maintaining two knights in the Holy Land for a year.  Much later, Henry arranged for his own daughter Matilda to marry Fulk's son Geoffrey V of Anjou, which she did in 1127 or 1128.

Crusader and king
By 1127 Fulk was preparing to return to Anjou when he received an embassy from King Baldwin II of Jerusalem. Baldwin II had no male heirs but had already designated his daughter Melisende to succeed him. Baldwin II wanted to safeguard his daughter's inheritance by marrying her to a powerful lord. Fulk was a wealthy crusader and experienced military commander, and a widower. His experience in the field would prove invaluable in a frontier state always in the grip of war.

However, Fulk held out for better terms than mere consort of the queen. He wanted to be king alongside Melisende. Baldwin II, reflecting on Fulk's fortune and military exploits, acquiesced. Fulk abdicated his county seat of Anjou to his son Geoffrey and left for Jerusalem, where he married Melisende on 2 June 1129. Later Baldwin II bolstered Melisende's position in the kingdom by making her sole guardian of her son by Fulk, Baldwin III, born in 1130.

Fulk and Melisende became joint rulers of Jerusalem in 1131 with Baldwin II's death. From the start Fulk assumed sole control of the government, excluding Melisende altogether. He favored fellow countrymen from Anjou to the native nobility. The other Crusader states to the north feared that Fulk would attempt to impose the suzerainty of Jerusalem over them, as Baldwin II had done. But as Fulk was far less powerful than his deceased father-in-law, the northern states rejected his authority. Melisende's sister Alice of Antioch, exiled from the Principality by Baldwin II, took control of Antioch once more after the death of her father. She allied with Pons of Tripoli and Joscelin II of Edessa to prevent Fulk from marching north in 1132. Fulk and Pons fought a brief battle before peace was made and Alice was exiled again.

In Jerusalem as well, Fulk was resented by the second generation of Jerusalem Christians who had grown up there since the First Crusade. These "natives" focused on Melisende's cousin, the popular Hugh II of Le Puiset, count of Jaffa, who was devotedly loyal to Melisende. Fulk saw Hugh as a rival, and it did not help matters when Hugh's own stepson accused him of disloyalty. In 1134, in order to expose Hugh, Fulk accused him of infidelity with Melisende. Hugh rebelled in protest. Hugh secured himself to Jaffa, and allied himself with the Muslims of Ascalon. He was able to defeat the army set against him by Fulk, but this situation could not hold. The patriarch Willam of Malines interceded in the conflict, perhaps at the behest of Melisende. Fulk agreed to peace and Hugh was exiled from the kingdom for three years, a lenient sentence.

However, an assassination attempt was made against Hugh. Fulk, or his supporters, were commonly believed responsible, though direct proof never surfaced. The scandal was all that was needed for the queen's party to take over the government in what amounted to a palace coup. Author and historian  wrote that Fulk's supporters "went in terror of their lives" in the palace. Contemporary author and historian William of Tyre wrote of Fulk: "He never attempted to take the initiative, even in trivial matters, without (Melisende's) consent." The result was that Melisende held direct and unquestioned control over the government from 1136 onwards. Sometime before 1136 Fulk reconciled with his wife, and a second son, Amalric, was born.

Securing the borders
Jerusalem's northern border was of great concern. Fulk had been appointed regent of the Principality of Antioch by Baldwin II. As regent he had Raymond of Poitou marry the infant princess Constance of Antioch, his and Melisende's niece. However, the greatest concern during Fulk's reign was the rise of Zengi, atabeg of Mosul.

In 1137 Fulk was defeated in battle near Baarin but allied with Mu'in ad-Din Unur, the vizier of Damascus. Damascus was also threatened by Zengi. Fulk captured the fort of Banias, to the north of Lake Tiberias and thus secured the northern frontier.

Fulk also strengthened the kingdom's southern border. His butler Paganus built the fortress of Kerak to the east of the Dead Sea, and to help give the kingdom access to the Red Sea, Fulk had Blanchegarde, Ibelin, and other forts built in the south-west to overpower the Egyptian fortress at Ascalon. This city was a base from which the Egyptian Fatimids launched frequent raids on the Kingdom of Jerusalem and Fulk sought to neutralise this threat.

In 1137 and 1142, Byzantine emperor John II Comnenus arrived in Syria attempting to impose Byzantine control over the crusader states. John's intention of making a pilgrimage, accompanied by his impressive army, to Jerusalem alarmed Fulk, who wrote to John pointing out that his kingdom was poor and could not support the passage of a large army. This lukewarm response dissuaded John from carrying through his intention, and he postponed his pilgrimage. John died before he could make good his proposed journey to Jerusalem.

Death
In 1143, while the king and queen were in Acre, Fulk was killed in a hunting accident. His horse stumbled, fell, and Fulk's skull was crushed by the saddle, "and his brains gushed forth from both ears and nostrils", as William of Tyre describes. He was carried back to Acre, where he lay unconscious for three days before he died. He was buried in the Church of the Holy Sepulchre in Jerusalem. Though their marriage started in conflict, Melisende mourned for him privately as well as publicly. Fulk was survived by his son Geoffrey by his first wife, and Baldwin and Amalric by Melisende.

A marble panel from his tomb (or Baldwin III's) is in the Terra Sancta Museum, Jerusalem. The panel includes rosettes, one of which has a cross pattée in its center.

Legacy

Depictions
According to William of Tyre, Fulk was "a ruddy man, like David... faithful and gentle, affable and kind... an experienced warrior full of patience and wisdom in military affairs." His chief fault was an inability to remember names and faces.

William described Fulk as a capable soldier and able politician, but observed that Fulk did not adequately attend to the defense of the crusader states to the north. Ibn al-Qalanisi (who calls him al-Kund Anjur, an Arabic rendering of "Count of Anjou") says that "he was not sound in his judgment nor was he successful in his administration." The Zengids continued their march on the crusader states, culminating in the fall of the county after the Siege of Edessa in 1144, which led to the Second Crusade.

Family
In 1110, Fulk married Erembourg/Ermengarde of Maine (died 1126), the daughter of Elias I of Maine. Their four children were:
 Geoffrey V of Anjou (1113–1151), father of Henry II of England.
 Sibylla of Anjou (1112–1165, Bethlehem), married in 1123 William Clito (div. 1124), married in 1134 Thierry, Count of Flanders.
 Matilda of Anjou (1106–1154, Fontevrault), married William Adelin; after his death in the White Ship disaster of 1120, she became a nun and later Abbess of Fontevrault.
 Elias II of Maine (died 1151)

His second wife was Melisende, Queen of Jerusalem. They married in 1129 and had two children:
 Baldwin III of Jerusalem
 Amalric of Jerusalem

References

Sources
Orderic Vitalis
Robert of Torigny
William of Tyre
Runciman, Steven (1952) A History of the Crusades, Vol. II: The Kingdom of Jerusalem, Cambridge University Press.
Medieval Women, edited by Derek Baker, the Ecclesiastical History Society, 1978
Payne, Robert. The Dream and the Tomb, 1984
The Damascus Chronicle of Crusades, trans. H.A.R. Gibb, 1932.

11th-century births
Year of birth uncertain
1143 deaths
12th-century kings of Jerusalem
Kings of Jerusalem
Regents of Antioch
Jure uxoris kings
Counts of Anjou
Deaths by horse-riding accident
People from Angers
12th-century French people
Burials at the Church of the Holy Sepulchre